VG-lista is a Norwegian record chart. It is presented weekly in the newspaper VG. It is considered the primary Norwegian record chart, charting albums and singles from countries and continents around the world. The data are collected by Nielsen Soundscan International and are based on the sales in approximately 100 shops in Norway. The singles chart started as a top 10 chart in week 42 of 1958 and was expanded to a top 20 chart in week 5 of 1995, the same time the albums chart, which started as a top 20 chart in week 1 of 1967 was expanded to a top 40 chart.

Charts published
The charts published weekly are:
Topp 40 Singles (until week 43 in 2014, a Topp 20 Singles chart)
Topp 40 Albums
Topp 10 Samlealbums (compilation albums)
DVD Audio
DVD Audio
DVD Audio
DVD Audio
Topp 10 Singles Norsk (only Norwegian language singles)
Topp 30 Albums Norsk (only Norwegian language albums)

See also
 List of number-one songs in Norway
 List of number-one albums in Norway

References

External links 
 
 Norwegiancharts.com Archives

Norwegian record charts
1958 establishments in Norway